The Icelandic Basketball Association Women's All-Star Game was a basketball exhibition game hosted by the Icelandic Basketball Association (KKÍ). It was held was held annually from 2004 to 2014 and featured a mix of the countries star players. The first annual All-Star Game was played at the Seljaskóli Stadium on 14 January 2004. It was last held on 24 January 2014 at the Ásvellir stadium.

The teams selections varied from year to year, with sports journalists selecting the teams during the first years while later teams were selected by fans and coaches. The teams buildup also varied, sometimes splitting the players to teams based on geography (Players from Suðurnes or the Capital Region versus the rest of the country) or pitting domestic players against foreign players.

The All-Star day also featured a three-point contest and a celebrity game.

All-Star Game results

All-Star Game MVP

References

2004 establishments in Iceland
Basketball all-star games
Basketball competitions in Iceland
Recurring sporting events established in 2004